Night Mode is a Russian sci-fi thriller film directed by Andrey Libenson. It stars Pavel Tabakov and Andrey Merzlikin. This film was theatrically released on August 18, 2022.

Plot 
The film tells about the photographer Roman, who is accused of killing four people. He is sure that he is innocent, but he is not able to remember what happened. Once in prison, he meets a mysterious man in his dreams who calls himself Master and offers his help.

Cast 
 Pavel Tabakov as Roman Belov
 Andrey Merzlikin as teacher
 Ekaterina Shumakova as Irina
 Andrey Karako as Kirill
 Andrey Dushechkin as Dmitry
 Igor Sigov as Sasha
 Andrey Oliferenko as warden
 Aleksei Trufanov as Filin
 Anton Makukha as Kadyk
 Viktor Bogushevich as Belomor

References

External links 
 

2022 films
2020s science fiction thriller films
2020s Russian-language films
Russian science fiction thriller films